Ellingtonia Moods and Blues is an album recorded in 1960 led by Paul Gonsalves.

Reception

In a review for AllMusic, Cub Koda called the album "one potent date," and wrote: "This is jazz from the days when albums were recorded in one day, and that was a good thing."

Jack Sohmer, writing for Jazz Times, stated: "Despite its brevity, this is an excellent and little-known session."

Pianist and composer Ethan Iverson commented: "The 'Ellington without Ellington' records are their own universe and I've never heard a bad one. I am keeping Ellingtonia Moods and Blues out and about in order to remember to keep listening to it. Gonsalves and Hodges know something particularly private and wonderful about playing the saxophone."

Track listing 
"It's Something That You Ought to Know"             
"Chocataw"
"The Line-up"
"Way, Way Back" 
"Day Dream" 
"I'm Beginning to See the Light" 
"D.A. Blues"

Performers 
Paul Gonsalves - Tenor Saxophone 
Johnny Hodges - Alto Saxophone 
Booty Wood - Trombone 
Ray Nance - Trumpet 
Jimmy Jones - Piano 
Al Hall - Bass 
Oliver Jackson - drums

References 

1960 albums
Paul Gonsalves albums
RCA Records albums